Baculitidae is a family of extinct ammonoid cephalopods that lived mostly during the Late Cretaceous, and often included in the suborder Ancyloceratina.

Baculitid genera are characterized by a small to minute initial coil of about two whorls followed by a long straight or slightly curved shaft. Genera are distinguished on the basis of size, general shape,  particulars of the suture, and ornamentation.

Baculitids are found worldwide in deposits from the upper Albian to the Maastrichtian ages. Related families are the Anisoceratidae, Diplomoceratidae, Hamitidae, Nostoceratidae, and Turrilitidae; all of which along with the Baculitidae are included in the superfamily Turrilitoidea.

Genera included in the family include:

Baculites
Boehmoceras
Eubaculites
Euhomaloceras
Fresvillia
Lechites
Pseudobaculites
Sciponoceras
Tuberosciponoceras

References

External links
 The Paleobiology Database Baculitidae entry
 The Paleobiology Database

Ammonitida families
Turrilitoidea
Albian first appearances
Maastrichtian extinctions